The Australian Olympic Committee (AOC) is the National Olympic Committee responsible for developing, promoting, and protecting the Olympic Movement in Australia.  The AOC has the exclusive responsibility for the representation of Australia at the Olympic Games (Summer and Winter), the Youth Olympic Games and at Regional Games patronized by the International Olympic Committee (IOC). All National Olympic Committees (currently 205 worldwide) are constituents of the International Olympic Committee.

Organisation
The Australian Olympic Committee is composed of 45 member National Sport Federations, representing each sport on the Olympic program for the Summer Olympic Games and the Olympic Winter Games.

The Australian Olympic Committee (AOC) is an independent, incorporated not-for-profit organisation committed to the development of youth and sport in Australia. The AOC is responsible to the International Olympic Committee (IOC) to develop, promote and protect the Olympic movement in Australia in accordance with the Olympic Charter.

The AOC is responsible for selecting the Team that represents Australia at the Olympic Games, after considering nominations by each National Sport Federation. The AOC also selects Teams for Youth Olympic Games and Regional Games, such as the Pacific Games.

The AOC Executive comprises the President, Ian Chesterman, who was elected in 2022 along with Vice Presidents Evelyn Halls and Matt Allen.

The Chief Executive Officer is Matt Carroll, who serves on the AOC Executive along with John Coates, who is the IOC Member in Australia. Other Executive members are Mark Arbib, Cate Campbell, Craig Carracher, Alisa Camplin-Warner, Kitty Chiller, Catherine Fettell, Michael Murphy, Elizabeth Scott and Ken Wallace.

John Coates, who retired as President in 2022 after 32 years in the role, has been an IOC member since 2001, serving on the Executive Board from 2009 – 2013  and 2020 to the present day and is currently an IOC Vice President. 

Patron in Chief is the Governor-General of the Commonwealth of Australia, General David Hurley, and Patron is the Prime Minister of Australia, currently The Hon Anthony Albanese MP.

The AOC has an Athletes' Commission, responsible for advising the AOC Executive on all matters pertaining to the Olympic Movement from an athlete's perspective. The Commission is made up of 11 members, all Olympians who have been elected by their Olympic teammates during a Summer and Winter Olympic Games.

The Chair is Cate Campbell (Swimming) while the Deputy Chair is Ken Wallace (Paddle) and remaining members are Andrew Charter (Hockey), Taliqua Clancy (Beach Volleyball), Jessica Fox (Paddle), Cameron Girdlestone (Rowing), Rachael Lynch (Hockey), Greta Small (Alpine Skiing), Brodie Summers (Freestyle Skiing - Moguls), Rowie Webster, (Water Polo) and Alex Winwood (Boxing).

History

Australia was represented by Edwin Flack at the 1896 Athens Olympics. Flack won two gold medals. In 1905, Richard Coombes became Australia's first International Olympic Committee member when he replaced New Zealander Leonard Cuff who represented Australasia. In 1914, the Olympic Federation of Australia and New Zealand (OFANZ) was established. In 1920, New Zealand left the OFANZ and the Australian Olympic Council was established with James Taylor being its first president. In 1923, Australian Olympic Council changed its name to the Australian Olympic Federation (AOF). In 1990, the AOF rescinded its constitution and became the Australian Olympic Committee (AOC).

Australia has hosted two Summer Olympics: 1956 Melbourne Olympics and 2000 Sydney Olympics. Brisbane, Queensland made at bid for the 1992 Summer Olympics and Melbourne, Australia made a bid for the 1996 Summer Olympics. In June 2021, it was announced that Brisbane would host the 2032 Summer Olympics, marking Australia's third hosting of the games.

Administration

Presidents/Chair
 James Taylor (1920–1944)
 Sir Harold Alderson (1944–1973)
 Sir Edgar Tanner (1973–1977)
 Sydney Grange (1977–1985)
 Kevan Gosper (1985–1990)
 John Coates (1990–2022)
 Ian Chesterman (2022–present)

Honorary Secretary/Secretary-General
 George Shand (acting) (1920)
 Oswald G H Merrett (1921–1924)
 James S W Eve (1924–1947)
 Sir Edgar Tanner(1947–1973)
 Julius L Patching (1973–1985)
 Phillip Coles (1985–1993)
 Perry Crosswhite (1993–1995)
 Craig McLatchey (1995–2001)
 Robert Elphinston (2001–2004)
 Craig Phillips (2005–2014)
 Fiona de Jong (2014–2016)*
 Matt Carroll AM (2017–present)

*As of 2015 Secretary General position is now chief executive officer

International Olympic Committee members
Leonard A Cuff (1894–1905) (New Zealander who represented Australasia), Richard Coombes (1905–1932), 
James Taylor (1924–1944), Sir Harold Luxton (1933–1951), Hugh R Weir, (1946–1975), Lewis Luxton (1951–1974), David H Mckenzie (1974–1981), Kevan Gosper, (1977–2013), Phillip W Coles (1982–2011), Susan O'Neill, (2000–2005), John D Coates (2001–2022), James Tomkins (2013–2021)

Funding
The AOC is not government funded. The AOC sources its revenues primarily through Sponsorship, Licensing, Fundraising activities, grants from the International Olympic Committee known as Olympic Solidarity and annual distributions from the Australian Olympic Foundation.

Team Appeal Committees in each state and territory also plan corporate events to achieve a national fundraising target. 

The AOC neither seeks nor derives any funding from the Australian Government. The Commonwealth Government, through the Australian Sports Commission and the Australian Institute of Sport, is the major funding source for high performance sport in Australia. The ASC/AIS, and State Institutes and Academies of Sport provide critical assistance to the AOCs member National Sport Federations and to athletes directly for their preparation for the Olympic Games.

In the period 2021–2024, the total AOC quadrennial funding of its Olympic programs is budgeted for in excess of $51 million. This funding includes sports on the program of the 2024 Summer Olympics, sports on the programs for the 2022 Olympic Winter Games, Olympian transition programs, and Olympic Education.

State Olympic Advisory Committees
State Olympic Advisory Committees provide a state-based opportunity for the Olympic movement amplify and activate its objectives around Australia. The Committees, which operate in all states and territories except Queensland and Western Australia, provide an important connection between the AOC, state sporting bodies, governments and Olympic alumni.

In Queensland and Western Australia, these functions are undertaken by State Olympic Councils which have a more formal governance structure, retaining an Articles of Association and Constitution respectively.

Australian Olympians Association
The Australian Olympians Association (AOA) provides a connection for all Olympians through functions and events, support for fellow Olympians in need and support for the current and upcoming Olympians and the ideals of the Olympic movement.  

The AOA was endorsed by the AOC Executive in 2021, replacing a previous network of state-based Olympians Clubs which started into being after the Tokyo 1964 Games and subsequent Games. 

The creation of the national body has enabled greater collaboration through quarterly meetings of State Delegates. The AOA operates under an Association Terms of Reference.

Community Programs
Since 2018, the AOC has expanded its outreach programs designed to use sport for the benefit of the community.

Olympic Unleashed engages school-aged children through the life journeys of Olympic athletes. Olympic athletes are specially trained to outline their life experiences in overcoming challenges to teach children the valuable lessons of resilience, goal setting and self-awareness. The Olympics Unleashed program continues to be rolled out across Australian primary and secondary schools, reaching more than 245,000 students and 1,800 schools since its inception in late 2018. 

More than 250 athletes have been trained to deliver the program. 

Australian Olympic Change-Maker program recognizes students who demonstrate leadership through sport and/ or use sport as a vehicle to improve health and wellbeing in their school and local community. In 2021 over 900 students Australia wide were recognized for their leadership and efforts to achieve positive changes in their school or local community.

The AOC is committed to providing practical support to Indigenous Reconciliation, seeking counsel from the AOC Indigenous Advisory Committee, which is Chaired by Patrick Johnson (Athletics).

Partnerships to deliver programs have included Indigenous Basketball Australia, Deadly Choices, Indigenous Marathon Foundation and the Cathy Freeman Foundation. 

The AOC is a signatory to the United Nations Sports for Climate Action Declaration, working collaboratively with peers and stakeholders to develop, implement and enhance the climate action agenda in sport.

International Olympic Committee members
Leonard A Cuff (1894–1905), Richard Coombes (1905–1932), 
James Taylor (1924–1944), Sir Harold Luxton (1933–1951), Hugh R Weir, (1946–1975), Lewis Luxton (1951–1974), David H Mckenzie (1974–1981), Kevan Gosper, (1977–2013), Phillip W Coles (1982–2011), Susan O'Neill, (2000–2005), John D Coates (2001–2022), James Tomkins (2013–2021)

See also

Australia at the Olympics
Australian Youth Olympic Festival
Australian Sports Commission
Australian Institute of Sport
Sport in Australia
Boxing Kangaroo
Olympic Winter Institute of Australia
Australian Olympic Foundation
Commonwealth Games Australia

References

Bibliography
 Andrews, Malcolm. Australia at the Olympics. Rev. ed. Sydney, ABC Books for the Australian Broadcasting Corporation, 2000.
Australian Olympic Committee. The compendium : official Australian Olympic statistics, 1896–2002 / compiled by the Australian Olympic Committee. St. Lucia., Qld., University of Queensland Press, c2003 
 Gordon, Harry. From Athens with pride : the official history of the Australian Olympic movement, 1894 to 2014. St Lucia, Qld., University of Queensland Press, 2014.
 Gordon, Harry. Gold! : an Olympic celebration. Melbourne : Wilkinson Publishing, 2008
 Poke, Robin ad Berry, Kevin (eds). Olympic gold : our greatest individual Olympians since 1896. Sydney, Murdoch Books, 2012.

External links

Australian Winter Olympic Institute

Oly
National Olympic Committees
 
1914 establishments in Australia
Sports organizations established in 1914
Sport in Australia